John E. McGlade (born 1954) is an American businessman. He is the former chairman, chief executive officer, and president of Air Products.

Biography

Early life and education
John McGlade was born in 1954 in Bethlehem, Pennsylvania. He received a Bachelor of Science in industrial engineering in 1976 and an M.B.A. in 1980, both from Lehigh University.

Career
He joined Air Products in 1976. He became president and chief executive officer in October 2007, and chairman of the board in April 2008.

He sits on the board of directors of the Goodyear Tire and Rubber Company, the American Chemistry Council, and the executive committee of the U.S. Council on Competitiveness. He is a member of the American Society of Chemical Industry. He sits on the board of trustees of his alma mater, Lehigh University.

In 2012, he earned US$11.36 million.

References

External links
Biography at Air Products

Living people
1954 births
American businesspeople
Lehigh University alumni
People from Bethlehem, Pennsylvania
Goodyear Tire and Rubber Company people
People in the chemical industry